This is a list of soccer clubs in Australia. The Australian soccer league system consists of one national league — A-League Men — a state/territory-based second tier National Premier Leagues (NPL) structure and other state-based leagues. Promotion and relegation exists in some states between NPL and state leagues, however not between the A-League Men and the NPL. Included are all clubs playing in state (or territory)-wide leagues, or where states are split into two separate leagues.

By league and division

Clubs from the following competitions are included on the list below. Reserve teams, or instances where one club fields teams in multiple divisions, are not included.

 A-League Men (Level 1)

 Capital Football
National Premier Leagues Capital Football (Level 2)
Capital Premier League (Level 3)

 Football NSW
National Premier Leagues NSW (Level 2)
NSW League One (Level 3)
NSW League Two (Level 4)
Illawarra Premier League, Western Premier League, Central Coast Premier League (Level 5)
Illawarra District League, Central Coast Division One (Level 6)

 Northern NSW Football
National Premier Leagues Northern NSW (Level 2)
Northern NSW State League Division 1 (Level 3)
Zone Premier League (Level 4)
Zone League One (Level 5)
Zone League Two (Level 6)
Zone League Three (Level 7)

 Football Queensland
National Premier Leagues Queensland (Level 2)
Football Queensland Premier League (Level 3)
Football Queensland Premier League 2 (Level 4)
Football Queensland Premier League 3 (Central Coast, Darling Downs, Far North & Gulf, Metro, Northern, South Coast, Sunshine Coast, Whitsunday Coast, Wide Bay) (Level 5)
Football Queensland Premier League 4 (Metro, South Coast) (Level 6)
Football Queensland Premier League 5 (Metro) (Level 7)
Football Queensland Premier League 6 (Metro) (Level 8)

 Football South Australia
National Premier Leagues South Australia (Level 2)
South Australian State League 1 (Level 3)
South Australian State League 2 (Level 4)

 Football Tasmania
National Premier Leagues Tasmania (Level 2)
Northern Championship (Level 3)
Southern Championship (Level 3)
Northern Championship One (Level 4)
Southern Championship One (Level 4)
Southern League Two (Level 5)
Southern League Three (Level 6)
Southern League Four (Level 7)
Southern League Five (Level 8)

 Football Victoria
National Premier Leagues Victoria (Level 2)
National Premier Leagues Victoria 2 (Level 3)
National Premier Leagues Victoria 3 (Level 4)
Victorian State League 1 (Level 5)
Victorian State League 2 (Level 6)
Victorian State League 3 (Level 7)
Victorian State League 4 (Level 8)
Victorian State League 5 (Level 9)
Victorian Metropolitan League Divisions 1–10 (Levels 10–20)

 Football West
National Premier Leagues Western Australia (Level 2)
Football West State League Division 1 (Level 3)
Football West State League Division 2 (Level 4)
Amateur Premier League (Level 5)
Amateur League Divisions 1–4 (Levels 6–9)
Metropolitan League Divisions 1–5 (Levels 10–15)

 Football Northern Territory
NorZone Premier League (Level 2)
Southern Zone Premier League (Level 2)
NorZone All Age League (Level 3)

Alphabetically

Key



A

B

C

D

E

F

G

H

I

J

K

L

M

N

O

P

Q

R

S

T

U

V

W

Y

Notes

See also

Australian Institute of Sport Football Program
Soccer in Australia
List of soccer clubs in Christmas Island
List of soccer clubs in the Cocos (Keeling) Islands
List of soccer clubs in Norfolk Island
List of Australian rules football clubs in Australia
List of baseball teams in Australia
List of basketball teams in Australia
List of cricket clubs in Australia
List of rowing clubs in Australia
List of rugby league clubs in Australia
List of rugby union clubs in Australia
List of yacht clubs in Australia

References

External links

Australia
Clubs
Soccer
Soccer